Szápár (historically: Szapár) is a village in Veszprém county, Hungary in Zirc District.

Populated places in Zirc District